The Ethiopian boubou (Laniarius aethiopicus) is a species of bird in the family Malaconotidae.
It is found in Eritrea, Ethiopia, northwest Somalia, and northern Kenya.

Its natural habitat is moist savanna.

Its breast and belly are pinkish. It has a narrow wing stripe, extending across the median and larger wing coverts, and often a bit onto the secondary remiges. Outer tail feathers never have white tips.

Recent cladistic analysis of nDNA BRM15 intron-15 and mtDNA NADH dehydrogenase subunit 2 and ATP synthase F0 subunit 6 sequence data indicates that the Ethiopian boubou is a polyphyletic cryptic species complex, which was once lumped with the tropical boubou, black boubou, and East Coast boubou.

A quill mite, Neoaulonastus malaconotus, has been identified as an ectoparasite of the species. It belongs to the Syringophilinae, a mite subfamily known to infect several bushshrike species.

References

Ethiopian boubou
Birds of the Horn of Africa
Ethiopian boubou
Ethiopian boubou